Ethiopoeus is a monotypic genus of beetles in the family Buprestidae, the jewel beetles. The sole species, Ethiopoeus croesus was moved from genus Meliboeus in 2008. This beetle is native to Africa.

References

External links

Monotypic Buprestidae genera
Beetles of Africa